Fatih Şen (born 23 September 1984) is a Turkish former professional footballer.

References

External links

1984 births
People from Beykoz
Footballers from Istanbul
Living people
Turkish footballers
Association football midfielders
Gaskispor footballers
Gaziantep F.K. footballers
Gaziantepspor footballers
Kartalspor footballers
Orduspor footballers
Giresunspor footballers
Karşıyaka S.K. footballers
Samsunspor footballers
Boluspor footballers
Adanaspor footballers
Adana Demirspor footballers
Pendikspor footballers
Kahramanmaraşspor footballers
Pazarspor footballers
Bayrampaşaspor footballers
Süper Lig players
TFF First League players
TFF Second League players
TFF Third League players